Cuffy is a commune in the Cher department in the Centre-Val de Loire region of France.

Geography

Population

Sights
 The church of St. Maurice, dating from the twelfth century.
 The ruins of a fourteenth-century motte and bailey castle.
 The  aqueduct of the Canal latéral à la Loire with 18 arches.

See also
Communes of the Cher department

References

Communes of Cher (department)